The 2019 Conference USA women's basketball tournament was a postseason women's basketball tournament for Conference USA that was held at The Ford Center at The Star in Frisco, Texas, from March 13 through March 16, 2019. In the first round and quarterfinals, two games were played simultaneously within the same arena, with the courts separated by a curtain. Rice won the conference tournament championship game over Middle Tennessee, 69–54. Nancy Mulkey was named the tournament's Most Valuable Player.

Seeds
The top twelve teams will qualify for the tournament. Teams will be seeded by record within the conference, with a tiebreaker system to seed teams with identical conference records.

Schedule

Bracket

All times listed are Central

See also
 2019 Conference USA men's basketball tournament

References

Conference USA women's basketball tournament
Conference USA women's basketball
2018–19 Conference USA women's basketball season